The Religious Structures of Woodward Avenue Thematic Resource (TR) is a multiple property submission to the National Register of Historic Places which was approved on August 3, 1982. The structures are located on Woodward Avenue in the cities of Detroit and Highland Park, Michigan.

History
In the early part of the 19th century, residential growth in Detroit occurred primarily east and west of Woodward, along Fort Street and Jefferson Avenue. Woodward Avenue was first developed as a residential district during the Civil War, as the downtown district became more business-oriented. By the turn of the century, Woodward was developed as far north as the present location of Interstate 94 as an upperclass residential section; mansions of society's elite were interspersed with architecturally significant churches. Although only a few of the mansions along Woodward remain (of the handful still extant, the David Whitney House, Col. Frank J. Hecker House, and Samuel L. Smith House are all on the National Register), many of the churches are represented in this TR.

After the turn of the century, and as the automobile expanded the scope of the city, Woodward rapidly changed character from an upscale residential area to a mix of commercial and multiple-family dwellings. Heirs to the 19th century mansions lining Woodward were already ensconced in their own homes in Boston-Edison, Arden Park-East Boston, or Virginia Park, and as the owners of the Woodward properties died, their homes were broken into apartments or razed. As congregants moved northward, more churches were established north of Grand Boulevard to serve people in the area. A string of churches were constructed in the 1920s and 1930s in this area.

In 1909, the Highland Park Ford Plant was completed in Highland Park, and a substantial population increase occurred in that city. More churches were constructed in Highland Park near this time to meet their needs.

In 1935-1936, Woodward was substantially widened just north of downtown Detroit, and nearly every building on the east side of the street between downtown and Forest Avenue was torn down; many of the churches in this TR were required to rebuild their facades. In the 1950s and 60s, most of the rest of the early homes in the area were torn down.

Significance
The structures in this TR are diverse in age and architectural style. Broken into age and style, there are:
 three High Victorian Gothic churches (1859-1887)
 two Richardson Romanesque structures (with two others already on the Register) (1889-1896)
 two neo-classical synagogues (1902-1922)
 five Gothic style, central-plan churches (1909-1926)
 seven neo-Gothic churches (1908-1930)

However, the structures are unified in that all are of stone (or brick with stone strim) construction. Most structures occupy corner lots, and most contain, in addition to the main church, a parich house, rectory, and/or smaller chapel. All structures sit well back from the streetline, save for those affected by the 1935-36 widening of Woodward.

These structures represent significant work by notable architects. Albert Kahn, who was best known for his concrete-reinforced industrial buildings, designed both of the Temples Beth-El (he was a congregant), as well as a portion of the First Congregational Church. Sidney Rose Badgley designed the Woodward Avenue Presbyterian Church as well as the Highland Park Presbyterian Church. The former is an excellent example of Badgley's trademark auditorium church style with steel-framed octagonal lantern dome atop. Ralph A. Cram designed the St. Paul Cathedral, and it is a major work early in the architect's career. Gordon W. Lloyd, who designed the Central United Methodist Church, was one of Michigan's most prominent late 19th century church architects. Likewise, William E. N. Hunter, who designed the Highland Park First United Methodist Church and the Metropolitan United Methodist Church, was one of Michigan's most prominent early 20th century church architects.

Structures
The submission includes nineteen architecturally and historically significant structures, stretching over six miles along Woodward Avenue from Grand Circus Park in Detroit to just south of McNichols. The structures included, in order from south to north, are:

{| class="wikitable"
!Resource name
!Also known as
!Image
!Address
!Built
!City
!Note
|-
| Central United Methodist Church
| 
| 
| 23 E. Adams (at Woodward)
| 1866
| Detroit
|
|-
| St. John's Episcopal Church
| 
| 
| 2326 Woodward (at Fisher Freeway)
| 1859
| Detroit
|
|-
| Woodward Avenue Baptist Church
| United House of Jeremiah
| 
| 2464 Woodward
| 1886
| Detroit
| The Woodward Avenue Baptist Church was  destroyed by fire in 1986 and delisted in 1988.
|-
| First Unitarian Church of Detroit
| Church of Christ of Detroit
| 
| 2870 Woodward (at Edmund Place)
| 1889
| Detroit
| Destroyed by a fire in May 2014
|-
| Temple Beth-El
| Bonstelle Theatre
| 
| 3424 Woodward
| 1902
| Detroit
|
|-
| Cathedral Church of St. Paul
| 
| 
| 4800 Woodward (at Hancock)
| 1908
| Detroit
|
|-
| Our Lady of the Rosary Church
| Saint Joseph's Episcopal Church
| 
| 5930 Woodward (At Edsel Ford Freeway)
| 1883
| Detroit
|
|-
| Metropolitan United Methodist Church
| 
| 
| 8000 Woodward (at Chandler)
| 1922
| Detroit
|
|-
| Woodward Avenue Presbyterian Church
| Abyssinia Church of God in Christ
| 
| 8501 Woodward (at Philadelphia)
| 1908
| Detroit
|
|-
| First Baptist Church
| Peoples Community Church
| 
| 8601 Woodward (at Pingree)
| 1909
| Detroit
|
|-
| North Woodward Congregational Church
| St. John's Christian Methodist Episcopal Church
| 
| 8715 Woodward (at Blaine)
| 1911
| Detroit
|
|-
| Temple Beth-El
| Lighthouse Cathedral
| 
| 8801 Woodward (at Gladstone)
| 1921
| Detroit
|
|-
| Saint Joseph's Episcopal Church
| St. Matthew-St. Joseph Episcopal Church
| 
| 8850 Woodward (at Holbrook)
| 1926
| Detroit
|
|-
| Central Woodward Christian Church
| Little Rock Baptist Church
| 
| 9000 Woodward
| 1926
| Detroit
|
|-
| Cathedral of the Most Blessed Sacrament
| 
| 
| 9844-54 Woodward (at Arden Park-Belmont)
| 1913
| Detroit
|
|-
| Highland Park Presbyterian Church
| Park United Presbyterian Church
| 
| 14 Cortland (at Woodward)
| 1910
| Highland Park
|
|-
| Grace Evangelical Lutheran Church
| Prayer Temple of Love Cathedral
| 
| 12375 Woodward (at Highland)
| 1929
| Highland Park
|
|-
| Trinity United Methodist Church
| New Mt. Moriah Baptist Church
| 
| 13100 Woodward
| 1922
| Highland Park
|
|-
| First United Methodist Church
| Soul Harvest Ministries
| 
| 16300 Woodward (at Church)
| 1916
| Highland Park
|
|}

In addition, three other religious structures along Woodward were listed on the National Historic Register before the Religious Structures of Woodward Ave. TR was approved. These three are:
{| class="wikitable"
!Resource Name
!Also known as
!Image
!Address
!Built
!City
!Note
|-
| Mariners' Church
| 
| 
| Jefferson and Randolph
| 1849
| Detroit
| Added earlier (April 11, 1971)
|-
| First Presbyterian Church
| Ecumenical Theological Seminary
| 
| 2930 Woodward
| 1889
| Detroit
| Added earlier (December 19, 1979)
|-
| First Congregational Church
| 
| 
| 33 Forest (at Woodward)
| 1891
| Detroit
| Added earlier (July 4, 1979)
|}

See also

List of buildings located along Woodward Avenue, Detroit
Lower Woodward Avenue Historic District
Midtown Woodward Historic District

References

.
Religious Structures, Woodward
Religious Structures, Woodward
Woodward, Religious Structures
.Woodward, Religious
Properties of religious function on the National Register of Historic Places in Michigan
National Register of Historic Places Multiple Property Submissions in Michigan
.
Culture of Detroit